Amanda Hopps (born 9 March 1970 in Zambia) is an Australian professional squash player. She reached a career high ranking of number 57 in the world. She has represented Australia as a junior and senior player. She has won the World Masters Squash Championships twice in 2008 (O/35) and 2014 (O/40).

References

1970 births
Living people
Australian female squash players